Monte Cornacchia is a mountain of the Apennine Mountains located in the western internal sector of the province of Foggia. It is the highest peak in the Daunian Mountains and the Apulia region.

Description
Cloaked in woods and pastures, Mount Cornacchia is located on the border between the municipalities of Biccari and Faeto. Along the northern slopes of the hill, the sources of the Vulgano stream gush out with some hydrocarbon deposits as well as Lake Pescara, the only natural mountain lake in Apulia (located at 902 m, extending over 3 hectares and 6 m deep). The southern side instead opens into a wide valley, the Valmaggiore, crossed by the Celone stream and populated by the only Franco-Provençal minority in Apulia.

From the top of the mountain, reachable via a carriage road, there is a vast landscape including the Gargano, the Tavoliere, the Irpinia, the Matese and the Maiella. A few meters from the summit there is a refuge built in 1980 and then reactivated in 2012 after a fire devastated it in 2007. By virtue of its considerable ecological importance, the entire massif of Mount Cornacchia, together with the contiguous forest of Faeto, is a site of community interest.

Sources

Mountains of Apulia
Highest points of Italian regions